Gunnhildur Gunnarsdóttir (born 7 August 1990) is an Icelandic basketball player and a former member of the Icelandic national basketball team. During her career, she won the Icelandic championship and the Icelandic Cup twice each. In 2016, she was named the Icelandic Women's Basketball Player of the Year.

Career
Gunnhildur played with Haukar from 2010 to 2014 and helped the club to the Úrvalsdeild finals twice, in 2012 when it lost to Njarðvík and in 2014 when it lost to her hometown team of Snæfell.

She helped Snæfell to the 2015 Úrvalsdeild finals, her third finals trip in four years. After the season she was named as the Úrvalsdeild Defensive Player of the Year and to the Úrvalsdeild Domestic All-First Team.

Gunnhildur helped Snæfell win the Icelandic Supercup on October 11, 2015. On November 25, she injured her shoulder in a national game against Slovakia and missed eight weeks.

In May 2016, she signed a contract extension with Snæfell for the 2016–2017 season. In December 2016, Gunnhildur was named the Icelandic Women's Basketball Player of the Year, ending Helena Sverrisdóttir's eleven-year reign.

After the 2017 finals, Gunnhildur revealed that she was pregnant and as a result would miss most of the coming season.

Gunnhildur averaged 11.6 points and 5.5 rebounds during 2018–19 season and was named to the Úrvalsdeild Domestic All-First Team for the third time.

She announced her retirement from basketball in April 2020 but returned to the court with Snæfell in October 2021, posting 16 points and 10 rebounds in a victory against Stjarnan on 12 October.

Icelandic national team
Gunnhildur was first selected to the Icelandic national basketball team in 2012. In total she played 36 games for the team.

Personal life
Gunnhildur's sister is basketball player Berglind Gunnarsdóttir, who played for Snæfell and the Icelandic national team.

Awards, titles and accomplishments

Individual awards
Icelandic Women's Basketball Player of the Year: 2016
Úrvalsdeild Domestic All-First Team (3): 2015, 2016, 2019
Úrvalsdeild Defensive Player of the Year (2): 2015, 2016

Titles
Icelandic champion (2): 2015, 2016
Icelandic Basketball Cup (2): 2014, 2016
Icelandic Supercup (3): 2014, 2015, 2016
Icelandic Company Cup : 2011
Icelandic Division I: 2008

Accomplishments
Icelandic All-Star game (2): 2010, 2011

References

External links
Icelandic statistics from 2008 at kki.is

1990 births
Living people
Gunnhildur Gunnarsdottir
Gunnhildur Gunnarsdottir
Haukar women's basketball players
Snæfell women's basketball players
Guards (basketball)